TeleVideo Corporation was a U.S. company that achieved its peak of success in the early 1980s producing computer terminals.  TeleVideo was founded in 1975 by K. Philip Hwang, a Utah State University, Hanyang University graduate born in South Korea who had run a business producing CRT monitors for arcade games since 1975. The company was headquartered in San Jose, California.

TeleVideo's terminal protocol was popular in the early days of microcomputers and was widely supported by applications as well as terminal emulators (often referred to as "TeleVideo 925 emulation").
 
TeleVideo also built CP/M-compatible 8-bit desktop and portable personal computers based on the Z80 processor. Up to sixteen of these machines could be connected to proprietary multi-user systems through serial interfaces.
In April 1983, TeleVideo introduced an MS-DOS 2.0-compatible personal computer based on the Intel 8088.  This was introduced as the Model TS-1603 and included 128 KB RAM (expandable up to 256 KB), integrated monitor, modem and keyboard. The Model TS-1603 ran both TeleVideo PC DOS 2.0 and CP/M-86 1.1.

The company later turned to manufacturing Windows-compatible thin client computers, but eventually sold this business line to Neoware in October 2005.  The latter was subsequently taken over by Hewlett-Packard in 2007.

On March 14, 2006, TeleVideo, Inc. filed a voluntary petition for reorganization under Chapter 11 of the United States Bankruptcy Code.

After more than 35 years in business and with millions of terminals sold worldwide, TeleVideo discontinued the manufacturing and sales of all terminal products as of September 30, 2011.

Products

 Terminals: TeleVideo 905, 910, 912, 914, 920, 921, 922, 924, 925, 9320, 935, 950, 955, 965, 970, 990, 995-65, Personal Terminal
 Graphic boards for Terminals: 914GR, 924GR, 970GR
 CP/M systems: TeleVideo TS-800, TS-802, TS-803
 CP/M Plus and MP/M II: TeleVideo TS-804 (4 users for MP/M II)
 CP/M-86/MS-DOS systems: TeleVideo TS-1603
 TeleVideo TPC-1, a portable CP/M system similar to the Osborne-1
 Early multi-user systems: TeleVideo TS-806 (6 users), TS-816 (16 users)
 [80286 IBM AT clone TELECAT 286], a small green desktop IBM AT clone with a 6 or 8 MHz 80286 CPU Trademark filing for TELECAT-286 1986

References

External links
Official website (mostly defunct)
TS-802 CP/M personal computer
Marcus Bennett's TeleVideo Documentation resource
 History of Televideo founders
 Background on TS-1603 All In One Computer
Terminals Wiki

1975 establishments in California
2011 disestablishments in California
American companies established in 1975
American companies disestablished in 2011
Companies based in San Jose, California
Companies that filed for Chapter 11 bankruptcy in 2006
Computer companies established in 1975
Computer companies disestablished in 2011
Defunct companies based in the San Francisco Bay Area
Defunct computer companies of the United States
Defunct computer hardware companies
Manufacturing companies established in 1975
Manufacturing companies disestablished in 2011
Technology companies based in the San Francisco Bay Area